John McCormack was an Irish soccer player who was active during the 1970s and 1980s.

Nicknamed "The Count," McCormack was a classy defender who played for Bohemians amongst others during his career in the League of Ireland He made 9 appearances for Bohs in European competition.

Honours
League of Ireland: 2
 Bohemians - 1974/75, 1977/78
FAI Cup: 1
 Bohemians - 1976
League of Ireland Cup: 2 
 Bohemians - 1975, 1979

References

Republic of Ireland association footballers
League of Ireland players
Bohemian F.C. players
Living people
Association footballers not categorized by position
Year of birth missing (living people)